The 1957–58 Divizia B was the 18th season of the second tier of the Romanian football league system.

The format with two series has been maintained, both of them having 14 teams. At the end of the season the winners of the series promoted to Divizia A, the last two places from each series relegated to Divizia C. This was the first season played in the autumn-spring system, after seven seasons played in the spring-autumn system, a system imposed by the Soviet influence existing in the country.

Team changes

To Divizia B
Promoted from Divizia C
 Foresta Fălticeni
 Locomotiva MCF București
 Energia Baia Mare
 Metalul Arad

Relegated from Divizia A
 Locomotiva Timișoara
 Știința Cluj
 Dinamo Bacău

From Divizia B
Relegated to Divizia C
 Progresul Satu Mare
 Locomotiva Iași
 Locomotiva Turnu Severin
 Flamura Roșie Bacău

Promoted to Divizia A
 Recolta Târgu Mureș
 Metalul Steagul Roșu

Renamed teams 
Avântul Reghin was renamed as Partizanul Reghin.

Dinamo 6 București was renamed as Dinamo Obor București.

Energia 1 Mai Ploiești was renamed as Prahova Ploiești.

Energia Baia Mare was renamed as Minerul Baia Mare.

Energia Câmpia Turzii was renamed as IS Câmpia Turzii.

Energia Câmpina was renamed as Poiana Câmpina.

Energia Hunedoara was renamed as Corvinul Hunedoara.

Energia Mediaș was renamed as Gaz Metan Mediaș.

Locomotiva Arad was renamed as CFR Arad.

Locomotiva Cluj was renamed as CFR Cluj.

Locomotiva Constanța was renamed as Farul Constanța.

Locomotiva MCF București was renamed as Rapid II București.

Locomotiva Timișoara was renamed as CFR Timișoara.

Metalul Arad was renamed as AMEF Arad.

Metalul Tractorul Orașul Stalin was renamed as Tractorul Orașul Stalin.

Progresul Focșani was renamed as Unirea Focșani.

Știința București was renamed as CSU București.

Other teams 
Flamura Roşie Burdujeni was moved from Burdujeni to Suceava and merged with the local team forming a new club, Progresul Suceava.

League tables

Serie I

Serie II

See also 

 1957–58 Divizia A

References

Liga II seasons
Romania
2